Constantin Marinescu (born 12 February 1923, date of death unknown) was a Romanian footballer who played as a defender.

International career
Constantin Marinescu played 11 games at international level for Romania, including six at the 1947 and 1948 Balkan Cup editions.

Honours
Unirea Tricolor București
Divizia A: 1940–41
Cupa României runner-up: 1940–41

Notes

References

External links

1923 births
Year of death missing
Romanian footballers
Romania international footballers
Association football defenders
Liga I players
Unirea Tricolor București players
FC Carmen București players
CSM Jiul Petroșani players
FC Dinamo București players
CS Corvinul Hunedoara players
FC Progresul București players
Footballers from Bucharest